"I'm on Fire" is a song originally recorded by Jerry Lee Lewis, who released it as a single, with "Bread and Butter Man" on the other side, in 1964 on Smash Records.

Track listing

Charts

References 

1964 songs
1964 singles
Jerry Lee Lewis songs
Smash Records singles